Joseph Mark Spalding, D.D., J.C.L. (born January 13, 1965) is an American prelate of the Roman Catholic Church. He has been serving as bishop of the Diocese of Nashville in Tennessee since 2017.

Biography

Early life 
Joseph Spalding was born on January 13, 1965, in Lebanon, Kentucky and grew up on the family farm in Washington County, Kentucky. His family has roots in the earliest Catholic presence west of the Appalachian Mountains.  His ancestors include Archbishop Martin Spalding, John Lancaster Spalding and Mother Catherine Spalding. 

Spalding graduated from Bethlehem High School in Bardstown, Kentucky in 1983; and obtained a Bachelor of Arts degree in history from Saint Meinrad Seminary and School of Theology in St. Meinrad, Indiana, in 1987. He received a master's degree and an Bachelor of Sacred Theology degree from the Catholic University of Louvain in Leuven, Belgium in 1990.

Priesthood 
Spalding was ordained to the priesthood on August 3, 1991, for the Archdiocese of Louisville at the Basilica of St. Joseph Proto-Cathedral by Archbishop Thomas C. Kelly.  Spalding returned to Louvain for a Licentiate in Canon Law.Spalding was appointed pastor of Holy Name Parish in Louisville, Kentucky, on October 1, 2016.

Bishop of Nashville
Pope Francis appointed Spalding on November 21, 2017, to be the twelfth bishop of the Diocese of Nashville. Spalding was consecrated on February 2, 2018.The concelebrants of the Mass were Archbishop Christophe Pierre and Cardinal Justin Rigali.

See also
 

 Catholic Church hierarchy
 Catholic Church in the United States
 Historical list of the Catholic bishops of the United States
 List of Catholic bishops of the United States
 Lists of patriarchs, archbishops, and bishops

References

External links
Roman Catholic Diocese of Nashville official website

Episcopal succession

1965 births
21st-century Roman Catholic bishops in the United States
Roman Catholic bishops of Nashville
Catholics from Kentucky
Living people
People from Lebanon, Kentucky
People from Washington County, Kentucky
Roman Catholic Archdiocese of Louisville
Bishops appointed by Pope Francis